Roneys Point Run is a  long 1st order tributary to Little Wheeling Creek in Ohio County, West Virginia.  This is the only stream of this name in the United States.

Course 
Roneys Point Run rises about 2.5 miles southeast of Clinton, West Virginia, in Ohio County and then flows southeast to join Little Wheeling Creek at Roneys Point.

Watershed 
Roneys Point Run drains  of area, receives about 41.0 in/year of precipitation, has a wetness index of 277.80, and is about 81% forested.

See also 
 List of rivers of West Virginia

References 

Rivers of Ohio County, West Virginia
Rivers of West Virginia